The British Association of Teachers of Dance (BATD) is a UK-based dance examination board, with its Head Office in Glasgow, Scotland.  The officially recognised date for the formation of the society is 30 November 1892, making it the first professional dance organization of its kind in the United Kingdom, and the second oldest in the world.

History of the BATD 

Founded in 1892, the BATD became the first UK dance association of its kind to encourage the organisation of dance professionals into an organised society.  The association may have been in operation earlier than this, however 30 November 1892 is the first recorded date that can be established beyond doubt (see BATD website).

There were 24 founder members recorded in 1892, with an estimated 3,500 members registered by the year 1999.

The British Association is represented in the following countries:
 United Kingdom
 Malta
 Canada
 United States of America
 Australia
 South Africa
 Spain
 France
 Italy
 Netherlands
 Germany
 Belarus
 Latvia
 South Korea
The BATD is represented in many other countries, but this list shows those countries where there are a notable number of registered members or where regular meetings of the association are held.

Configuration of the Society 
The Society is managed by a president, vice-presidents, trustees treasurer and an executive council.  These are all elected positions, which are balloted at the societies annual conference.
There are various other regional or district committees, which organize meetings, lectures, seminars and other events for the membership in their district.  These positions are nominated and elected by the membership of each district and include a chairperson, vice-chairperson, secretary, treasurer and marshall.
Members of the society can seek higher office, first at regional level then at the executive level.

Diane Barron was the president of the association from 2001 to 2005.

Branches 
The primary work of the society is to provide examination syllabi in various dance styles.  There are a number of branches within the society that each specialise in a specific dance subject. They are:
 Tap
 Stage (known as Theatre or Stage Craft in other organisations)
 Ballet
 Highland
 Modern Dance
 Jazz
 Acrobatic Dance
 Hornpipe
 Jig
 Traditional Step Dancing
 European National Ballroom
 Latin American
 Classical
 Disco
 Rock'n'Roll
 Country and Western
 Scottish Country Dance
 Dance Exercise
 Scottish National Dance
 Majorette
 Dance and Drama
 Special Needs Awards
A range of examinations and awards are available in each dance discipline for children of all ages.  These are typically organized into grades or medal tests, with the work being assessed by a BATD registered examiner.  As well as these examinations for children, the society also offers training for adults and teacher training for dance professionals who wish to become a registered teacher with the BATD.

References

External links 
 British Association of Teachers of Dance - Official Website

Dance organizations
United Kingdom
Dance in the United Kingdom
Performing arts education in the United Kingdom
Organisations based in Glasgow
1892 establishments in the United Kingdom
Organizations established in 1892